Roy Thomas Frank Bentley (17 May 1924 – 20 April 2018) was an English football player and manager.

A former forward, Bentley played 367 games for Chelsea and captained the club to their first League Championship in the 1954–55 season. He also won 12 caps for the England national side.

Personal life
Bentley was born in Shirehampton, Bristol, Gloucestershire and attended Portway Boys Secondary School.

He married Violet M. Upton in 1946.

Club career

Early years
Bentley served in the Royal Navy during the Second World War and afterwards played for both Bristol City and Bristol Rovers before signing for Newcastle United in 1946. He was with the club for less than two years, but formed a key part of a forward line which also included Jackie Milburn, Len Shackleton and Charlie Wayman. He reached an FA Cup semi-final with the club in the 1946–47 season, but they were defeated 4–0 by eventual winners Charlton Athletic.

Chelsea
In January 1948 Bentley signed for London side Chelsea for £11,000, He captained Chelsea to their first League title, in 1954–55.

Having scored 150 goals in 367 appearances, Bentley was Chelsea's top goalscorer and, at the time of his death in 2018, was fifth in Chelsea's all-time goalscorers list behind Bobby Tambling, Frank Lampard, Kerry Dixon and Didier Drogba.

International career
Bentley was an England international for six years, playing at the 1950 FIFA World Cup.

Management
Following his retirement from playing, Bentley moved into management. He took over at Reading and later Swansea City, winning promotion to the old Third Division with the latter. He returned to Reading in 1977, this time as club secretary.

Retirement and death
Bentley lived in Chigwell, Essex during the late 1980s before relocating to Reading, Berkshire where he lived in 2014. At his death in April 2018, he was the last surviving player from England's 1950 World Cup squad.

Career statistics

Playing statistics

Club
Source:

International

Managerial statistics

References

Bibliography

1924 births
2018 deaths
Footballers from Bristol
English footballers
England international footballers
Association football forwards
Bristol City F.C. players
Newcastle United F.C. players
Chelsea F.C. players
Fulham F.C. players
Queens Park Rangers F.C. players
English Football League players
English Football League representative players
London XI players
1950 FIFA World Cup players
English football managers
Reading F.C. managers
Swansea City A.F.C. managers
English Football League managers
Royal Navy personnel of World War II